Kübra Yılmaz (born January 8, 1991) is a Turkish women's handballer, who plays in the Turkish Women's Handball Super League for Ardeşen GSK, and the Turkey national team. The -tall sportswoman plays in the right wing position.

Between 2010 and 2013, she played for Muratpaşa Bld. SK.

References 

1991 births
Sportspeople from Erzurum
Turkish female handball players
Muratpaşa Bld. SK (women's handball) players
Ardeşen GSK players
Turkey women's national handball players
Living people
21st-century Turkish women